Mats Frøshaug (born 31 July 1988, in Manglerud, Norway) is a Norwegian professional ice hockey player who is currently with Västervik of HockeyAllsvenskan.

Club career

Early career
Frøshaug grew up playing for Manglerud Star, but 16 years of age, he moved to Sweden and began his junior career with Sunne. He played two seasons in the J18 and J20 Elit, beginning in 2004–05. He made his professional debut with Sunne in 2005–06, playing 14 games in Sweden's third-tier hockey league.

Linköping and NHL draft
The next season, he signed with Linköping and began competing in Sweden's premier junior league, the J20 SuperElit.  After a 36-point season in 35 games with Linköping in 2007–08, he was drafted by the Vancouver Canucks in the sixth round, 161st overall, in the 2008 NHL Entry Draft.  That season, he also made his Elitserien debut, playing in two games with Linköping.  Continuing to play in the Elitserien in 2008–09, he was loaned to Luleå on November 25, 2008, for the remainder of the season.

Back in Norway
As a result of limited ice time at Luleå, Frøshuag joined Sparta Warriors on 13 January 2009. On 18 January 2010, it was announced that Frøshaug was loaned out to his maiden club, Manglerud Star, for the rest of 2009–10.

International career
Frøshaug represented Norway at the 2008 IIHF World Championship in Canada.

References

External links

1988 births
Living people
Linköping HC players
Lørenskog IK players
Luleå HF players
Manglerud Star Ishockey players
Norwegian ice hockey centres
Nyköpings Hockey players
Sparta Warriors players
Vancouver Canucks draft picks
Norwegian ice hockey left wingers